

History
In 1985, a year after downgrading all of their ice hockey programs from Division II to Division III, the SUNYAC teams began to hold an unofficial conference tournament. All of the programs were in the ECAC West at the time and still eligible to participate in that conference tournament so the SUNYAC championship was held just before the ECAC West Men's Tournament. In 1992 the SUNYAC conference began sponsoring ice hockey as a men's sport and all SUNYAC teams left the ECAC West to formally found the new ice hockey division. When the tournament became an official conference championship the format was changed to a two-game point system where teams would receive 2 points for a win and one point for a tie. If the teams remained tied after two games then a 20-minute mini-game would be played to determine the winner. By NCAA regulations mini games do not count for team records or statistics. The tournament was expanded to six games in 1998 with all rounds using the point system. in 2007 the points system was abandoned and all rounds were changed to single-elimination. The 2021 tournament was cancelled due to the COVID-19 pandemic.

1985

Note: * denotes overtime period(s)

1986

Note: * denotes overtime period(s)

1987

Note: * denotes overtime period(s)

1988

Note: * denotes overtime period(s)

1989

Note: * denotes overtime period(s)

1990

Note: * denotes overtime period(s)

1991

Note: * denotes overtime period(s)

1992

Note: * denotes overtime period(s)

1993

Note: * denotes overtime period(s)Mini games in italics

1994

Note: * denotes overtime period(s)Mini games in italics

1995

Note: * denotes overtime period(s)Mini games in italics

1996

Note: * denotes overtime period(s)Mini games in italics

1997

Note: * denotes overtime period(s)Mini games in italics

1998

Note: * denotes overtime period(s)Mini games in italics

1999

Note: * denotes overtime period(s)Mini games in italics

2000

Note: * denotes overtime period(s)Mini games in italics

2001

Note: * denotes overtime period(s)Mini games in italics

2002

Note: * denotes overtime period(s)Mini games in italics

2003

Note: * denotes overtime period(s)Mini games in italics

2004

Note: * denotes overtime period(s)Mini games in italics

2005

Note: * denotes overtime period(s)Mini games in italics

2006

Note: * denotes overtime period(s)Mini games in italics

2007

Note: * denotes overtime period(s)

2008

Note: * denotes overtime period(s)

2009

Note: * denotes overtime period(s)

2010

Note: * denotes overtime period(s)

2011

Note: * denotes overtime period(s)

2012

Note: * denotes overtime period(s)

2013

Note: * denotes overtime period(s)

2014

Note: * denotes overtime period(s)

2015

Note: * denotes overtime period(s)

2016

Note: * denotes overtime period(s)

2017

Note: * denotes overtime period(s)

2018

Note: * denotes overtime period(s)

2019

Note: * denotes overtime period(s)

2020

Note: * denotes overtime period(s)Note: The Oswego vs. Plattsburgh semifinal was rescheduled from February 29 to March 3

2022

Note: * denotes overtime period(s)

2023

Note: * denotes overtime period(s)

Championships

References

External links

Ice hockey
State University of New York Athletic Conference
Recurring sporting events established in 1985
1985 establishments in New York (state)